Calzada Larga is a town in the Panamá Province of Panama,  north of Panama City.

References 

Populated places in Panamá Province